Wormegay is a civil parish in the English county of Norfolk.

For the purposes of local government, it falls within the district of King's Lynn and West Norfolk. Norfolk County Council is responsible for roads, some schools, and social services. For Westminster elections the parish forms part of the North West Norfolk constituency.

The place-name 'Wormegay' is first attested in the Domesday Book of 1086, and means 'the island of Wyrm's people'.

The parish church is a Grade II* listed building. Just to the west of the village centre lies Wormegay Castle, a motte-and-bailey earthwork.

Notes

External links

.
Information from Genuki Norfolk on Wormegay

Villages in Norfolk
King's Lynn and West Norfolk
Civil parishes in Norfolk